Sir John Dennis Boles  (25 June 1925 – 1 July 2013), was a British Colonial Service officer in North Borneo, and later in England worked for the National Trust, serving as its Director-General from 1975 to 1983.

Early life
A son of Geoffrey Boles, an officer in the Royal Navy, Boles was born at Waterlooville, near Portsmouth, while his father was attached to HMS Vernon, the navy's on-shore School of Gunnery. His father later became a land agent in Devon and the family settled at Talaton, near Ottery St Mary. The young Boles was educated at West Downs School and Winchester College, and in 1943 on leaving school he joined the British Army.

Career
In November 1944 Boles was commissioned into the Rifle Brigade, but a motorcycle accident kept him out of the fighting in Europe. From 1945 to 1946 he was stationed in Egypt.

After leaving the army Boles joined the Colonial Service, learning Arabic and Hebrew for working in Mandatory Palestine, but instead was posted as a district officer to North Borneo, a British protectorate which had suffered from Japanese occupation. He learned to speak Malay and stayed there for seventeen years, becoming a district commissioner. North Borneo was moving towards becoming part of an independent Malaysia, and Boles became Secretary to the last British Governor, Sir William Goode. After independence, which took place on 16 September 1963, he stayed on for a further year as Secretary to the new federal Government of Malaysia's Minister for Land and Natural Resources.

Boles returned home to England late in 1964. In 1965, he joined the National Trust as Assistant Secretary. There he rose through different roles and served as its Director-General from 1975 to 1983, when he retired. With his second wife, he then settled at his childhood home, Rydon House, Talaton, Devon, spending his time restoring the garden, shooting, fishing, and keeping bees. He became a churchwarden and joined the National Trust's committee for Devon and Cornwall, was appointed a Deputy Lieutenant for the county, and was High Sheriff of Devon for 1993.

Private life
In 1953 Boles married Benita Wormald, and they had five children, four born in North Borneo and a fifth, Nick, born in England in 1965. In 1969, his wife died of cancer. In 1971 he married secondly Lady Anne Waldegrave, a  National Trust colleague and a daughter of Earl Waldegrave.

Honours
 Member of the Order of the British Empire (MBE), 1960
 Knight Bachelor (Kt), 1983
 Deputy lieutenant of Devon (DL)
 High Sheriff of Devon 1993-94

Notes

2013 deaths
1925 births
British colonial officials
National Trust people
People educated at Winchester College
People educated at West Downs School
Knights Bachelor
Members of the Order of the British Empire
Rifle Brigade officers
Deputy Lieutenants of Devon
High Sheriffs of Devon
British Army personnel of World War II